Syrnola michaeli is a species of slimy sea snail, a marine gastropod mollusk in the family Pyramidellidae, the pyrams and their allies.

Distribution
This marine species occurs off Tasmania.

References

External links
 To World Register of Marine Species

Pyramidellidae
Gastropods described in 1877